Mogadishu Avenue is a Finnish drama comedy TV series written by Jari Tervo. The series deals with the everyday life of immigrants in Finland.

The name Mogadishu Avenue comes from a nickname of various streets in eastern Helsinki, particularly the main street in Meri-Rastila, where many Somali immigrants live. The nickname itself comes from Mogadishu, the capital of Somalia.

External links
 Mogadishu Avenue on MTV3's website
 

Comedy-drama television series
Finnish drama television series